Crime rates in Singapore are some of the lowest in the world, with petty crimes such as pickpocketing and street theft rarely occurring, and violent crime being extremely rare. Penalties for drug offences such as trafficking in Singapore are severe, and include the death penalty.

Rates of Crimes of Foreign Workers 
In December 2013 Prime Minister Lee Hsien Loong said: "I don’t think that is fair or justifiable because their (foreign workers) crime rates are, in fact, lower than Singaporeans in general." In January 2014 Mrs. Lina Chiam of Singapore People's Party asked in Parliament, the breakdown of crimes committed by Singaporeans, permanent residents and foreigners respectively between 2009 and 2013. Deputy Prime Minister Teo Chee Hean replied that during the period, more than 18,000 persons were arrested each year, of which 20% were foreigners with an arrest rate of 272 per 100,000 foreigners, while the arrest rate for residents was 385 per 100,000 residents. No breakdown between Singaporeans and permanent residents was given.

Scams 
However, there was a noteworthy increase in awareness about scamming in 2015. From just 66 credit-for-sex scams in 2014, the number increased to 1,203 within 2015, with the reported victims being cheated a total of around S$2.9 million. The largest amount of money scammed include S$74,000 in a single case. A fraud syndicate was busted in China during December 2015 when a total of 43 were arrested from scams operated from WeChat call centres in Mainland China.
	
During the same period, internet love scams where women were the primary target and victims, also rose from 198 in 2014 to 383 in 2015, involving around S$12 million in total. The largest amount of money cheated include S$528,000 in a single case.

E-commerce cheating cases increased by about 30 per cent between 2014 and 2015. Noted concerns as of 2016 may also include impersonation and employment scams.

Sex trafficking

Sex trafficking in Singapore is a significant problem. Singaporean and foreign women and girls have been forced into prostitution in brothels and been physically and psychologically abused.

Crime deterrence

The National Crime Prevention Council of Singapore maintains a web portal Scam Alert that offers scam prevention campaign posters and also encourages victims to come forward to share their stories.

The Neighbourhood Watch Zone scheme was formed in 27 April 1997 and today includes the Citizens On Patrol (COP) initiative, which conducts regular foot patrol with community policing. Officers go around each neighbourhood to project police presence and to disseminate crime prevention pamphlet to the residents.

See also
 Corruption in Singapore
 Criminal law of Singapore
 List of major crimes in Singapore
 Capital punishment in Singapore
 Organized crime in Singapore
 Law of Singapore

References

External links
 Singapore Police Force Annual 2013
 OSAC2007
 The World Factbook